is a passenger railway station located in the village of Chōsei, Chiba Prefecture Japan, operated by the East Japan Railway Company (JR East).

Lines

Station layout
The station consists of two opposed side platforms connected to a two-story station building by a footbridge. The station is staffed.

Platform

History
It was absorbed into the Japanese Government Railways on 1 September 1907, and was renamed to its present name on 11 March 1915. It joined the JR East network upon the privatization of the Japan National Railways (JNR) on 1 April 1987.

Passenger statistics
In fiscal 2019, the station was used by an average of 726 passengers daily (boarding passengers only).

Surrounding area
 
 Chōsei Village Hall

See also
 List of railway stations in Japan

References

External links

  JR East Station information 

Railway stations in Japan opened in 1898
Railway stations in Chiba Prefecture
Sotobō Line
Chōsei